Hugh Phillip Possingham, FAA (born 21 July 1962), is the Queensland Chief Scientist and is best known for his work in conservation biology, applied ecology, and basic ecological theory including population ecology. He is also a Professor of Mathematics, Professor of Zoology and an ARC Laureate Fellow in the Department of Mathematics and the School of Biological Sciences at The University of Queensland.

Career
Possingham received his bachelor's degree with Honours in 1984, from the department of Applied Mathematics at the University of Adelaide. He completed his D.Phil. at Oxford University under Michael Bulmer in 1987, on a Rhodes Scholarship. His thesis focused on optimal foraging theory.

Possingham's first postdoctoral position was with Joan Roughgarden at Stanford University, working on the recruitment dynamics of intertidal communities. He then returned to Australia on a QEII Fellowship at the Australian National University, and undertook research on applications of population viability analysis to conservation biology. He moved to the University of Adelaide, first as a lecturer, then in 1995 as a Professor. In 2000 Possingham moved to a chair in the departments of Mathematics and Biological Sciences at the University of Queensland in Brisbane, where he was an ARC Professorial, Federation, and Laureate Fellow. He was Director of the Australian Research Council Centre of Excellence for Environmental Decisions, and the Australian government's Threatened Species Recovery Hub. In 2016 he joined The Nature Conservancy as its Chief Scientist. In September 2020 he was appointed the Queensland Chief Scientist

During his academic career, Possingham has published over 650 peer-reviewed papers, and supervised 135 doctoral and postdoctoral researchers. He co-developed the Marxan software for systematic conservation planning, which is considered "the most significant contribution to conservation biology to emerge from Australia's research community". It has been used to plan terrestrial and marine protected area networks for 5% of the Earth's surface, including Australia's Great Barrier Reef.

Public roles
Possingham became the Queensland Chief Scientist in 2020, where he provides high-level strategic science, research and innovation advice to the Queensland Government and acts as an ambassador for science in Queensland.

Possingham is a member of the Wentworth Group of Concerned Scientists, chaired the Australian Government's committees on Biodiversity Hotspots, and on Biological Diversity, the Queensland Government's Smart State Council, and the Wilderness Society's Wild Country Science Council.

Possingham co-authored "The Brigalow Declaration" with Dr Barry Traill, used by Queensland Premier Beattie to support an end to land-clearing in Queensland. Land clearance in Queensland was removing 500,000 hectares of native vegetation each year, and was responsible for 10% of Australia's greenhouse gas emissions; its cessation enabled Australia to meet its Kyoto Protocol target. In 2009 he proposed devoting a proportionate fraction of gambling revenues to saving an endangered species, to be selected by a random drawing shown on television before the Melbourne Cup.

From 2016 to 2020, Possingham was the Chief Scientist of The Nature Conservancy, a global conservation organisation with 400 scientists and 4000 staff, that has protected more than 40 million hectares of land and thousands of kilometres of rivers worldwide.

Awards

Possingham won the Australian Mathematical Society Medal, the inaugural Fenner Medal for plant and animal biology from the Australian Academy of Science, and the 1999 and 2009 Eureka Prizes for Environmental Research. In 2016 he was awarded the Mahathir Science Award for Tropical Natural Resources, alongside Kerrie Wilson and Eric Meijard.

He was elected to the Australian Academy of Science in 2005. He was the first Australian to be elected a fellow of the Ecological Society of America, and in 2016 he was elected a foreign associate of the USA National Academy of Sciences.

References

External links
 Website
 Curriculum Vitae
 Decision Point Magazine

Selected bibliography

Recruitment dynamics in complex life cycles. Roughgarden J, Gaines SD & Possingham HP. Science (1988) 241:1460-1466.
Limits to the use of threatened species lists. Possingham HP. et al. (2002) Trends in Ecology and Evolution 17:503-507.
Prioritising global conservation efforts. Wilson KA, McBride M, Bode M & Possingham HP. Nature (2006) 440:337-340.
Active adaptive management conservation. McCarthy M & Possingham HP. Conservation Biology (2007) 21:956-963.
Optimal allocation of resources among threatened species. Joseph L, Maloney R & Possingham HP. Conservation Biology (2009) 23:328-338.
Six common mistakes in conservation priority setting. Game E, Kareiva P & Possingham HP. Conservation Letters (2013) 27:480-485.
Optimal conservation outcomes require both restoration and protection. Possingham HP, Bode M, Klein CK. PLOS Biology (2015) e1002052.

1962 births
Living people
Alumni of St John's College, Oxford
Australian Rhodes Scholars
Fellows of the Australian Academy of Science
Mathematical ecologists
Foreign associates of the National Academy of Sciences
University of Adelaide alumni
People educated at St Peter's College, Adelaide
Academic staff of the University of Queensland
Fellows of the Ecological Society of America
Conservation biologists